Sex and Travel is the second album by British pop group Right Said Fred, released on 1 November 1993. It contains the singles from the UK Top 60, "Bumped", "Hands Up (4 Lovers)" and "Wonderman". The album peaked at  35 on the UK Albums Chart. The lyrics to "Wonderman" were re-written for its release as a single in February 1994, as part of a promotional campaign for Sega's video game Sonic the Hedgehog 3.

Track listing
"Hands Up (4 Lovers)"
"Bumped"
"It's Not the Way"
"She's My Mrs."
"We Live a Life"
"Rocket Town
"Turn Me On"
"Back to You"
"I Ain't Stupid"
"Wonderman"
"Comfort Me"
"Sunshine Sex Drive"

Charts

References

1993 albums
Right Said Fred albums
Virgin Records albums